Monroeville may refer to:

Monroeville, Alabama
Monroeville, California, former seat of Colusa County
Monroeville, California, former name of Hales Grove, California, in Mendocino County
Monroeville, Indiana
Monroeville, New Jersey
Monroeville, Ohio (in Huron County)
Monroeville, Jefferson County, Ohio
Monroeville, Pennsylvania
Monroeville Vineyard & Winery, a winery in New Jersey